Maurice Brydon Foster (September 8, 1933 – October 2, 2010) was a Canadian veterinarian and politician. He represented the electoral district of Algoma in the House of Commons of Canada from 1968 to 1993. He was a member of the Liberal Party.

Born in Bloomfield, Ontario, Foster attended the Ontario Veterinary College in Guelph and received a Doctor of Veterinary Medicine degree in 1957. He then moved to Carnduff, Saskatchewan where he practiced as a veterinarian. In 1959, he moved to Desbarats near Sault Ste. Marie, Ontario.

In 1968, he was elected to the House of Commons of Canada for the riding of Algoma. After retiring in 1993, he served as an adviser to Prime Minister Jean Chrétien. He retired in 2001.

He died in 2010 after a three-year battle with pulmonary fibrosis.

Electoral record

References

1933 births
2010 deaths
Liberal Party of Canada MPs
Members of the House of Commons of Canada from Ontario
People from Prince Edward County, Ontario
Deaths from pulmonary fibrosis
People from Carnduff